Jerome Paul "Jerry" Shay (born July 10, 1944 in Gary, Indiana) is a former American football defensive tackle for the Minnesota Vikings, Atlanta Falcons, and New York Giants of the National Football League (NFL). Shay played college football at Purdue University, he was named All-American by the American Football Coaches Association and was the seventh selection overall in the 1966 NFL Draft by the Minnesota Vikings.

He was inducted into the Indiana Football Hall of Fame in 1996, the Purdue University Hall of Fame in 2010.

Shay is currently the Assistant Director of College Scouting for the New York Giants and has been a member of the team's scouting staff since 1977.

References

American football defensive tackles
Living people
1944 births
Minnesota Vikings players
Atlanta Falcons players
New York Giants players
Purdue Boilermakers football players
Players of American football from Gary, Indiana